Mysore is a city in Mysore district, and its administrative seat.

Mysore also refers to:

Places

Inhabited places
Kingdom of Mysore, a kingdom founded about 1400 CE by the Wodeyar dynasty
Mysore State, the name of Karnataka before 1973
Mysore District, an administrative district in Mysore Division for administrative purposes
Mysore Division, an area that includes the districts of Mysore, Chamarajanagar, Mandya, Dakshina Kannada, Udupi, Kodagu, Chikmagalur and Hassan, for tax purposes
Mysore (Lok Sabha constituency), one of the 28 Lok Sabha Constituencies in Karnataka, for electoral purposes
Mysore Railway Division, one of 69 Railway divisions in India
Mysore (region), an unofficial region in the state of Karnataka
Mysore East, a suburb of Mysore in Karnataka province, India
Mysore North, a cluster of suburbs Mysore in Karnataka province, India
Mysore South, a cluster of suburbs Mysore in Karnataka province, India

Other places
University of Mysore, a public university in Karnataka
Mysore Palace, a palace in Mysore, Karnataka
Mysore Plateau, one of the four geographically unique regions of Karnataka, India

Transportation
 INS Mysore (C60), a Crown Colony class light cruiser, the former HMS Nigeria, commissioned into the Indian Navy in 1957, and decommissioned in 1985
 INS Mysore (D60), a 1993 Delhi-class destroyer of the Indian Navy built in India

Military
 Mysore (129), a Royal Air Force squadron active during World War II
 Mysore (1789–91), the action of native units of the British East India Company in the Third Anglo-Mysore War of 1789–92
Anglo-Mysore Wars, a series of wars fought over the last three decades of the 18th century between the Kingdom of Mysore and the British East India Company
First Anglo-Mysore War
Second Anglo-Mysore War
Third Anglo-Mysore War
Mysorean rockets, Rockets used during Anglo-Mysore Wars

Other uses
Mysore pak, a sweet dish of Karnataka made of ghee (clarified butter), sugar and chick pea (besan) flour
Mysore style, a style of yoga
Mysore painting, a form of classical South Indian painting that originated in Mysore
Mysore Dasara, the state festival of Karnataka
Mysore Vasudevachar (1865–1961), an Indian musician and composer of Carnatic music
Venky Mysore, Indian business executive